Seven Keys was an American game show hosted by Jack Narz and based on Snakes and Ladders. Seven Keys aired from September 12, 1960, to January 15, 1965; initially on Los Angeles' KTLA and then on ABC before ending on KTLA.

The first KTLA series was one of the few non-syndicated television game shows to air daily in nighttime. The ABC version aired in daytime.

Game play
A solo contestant attempted to advance along a 70-square board by solving problems on certain squares. The contestant pressed a button to stop a spinning dial, then moved the number of spaces shown on the dial, from 1 to 10.

The contents of the boards varied. Some had pictures of celebrities and others had word puzzles. One board required the contestant to determine which celebrity in a pair was missing, while another dealt with the United States and their state capitals.

Each stop took one turn and contestants had 15 turns to get to the last square, kept track of by a counter above the board. If they answered a question incorrectly, they went back to the last safe square reached. If a question was landed on more than once it was treated as a free move.

Reaching the final space earned one of the "Seven Keys", each of which corresponded to a particular lock that a prize was behind. Six of the keys unlocked various smaller prizes while one unlocked a large prize package that changed with each new contestant. Unlike Chutes and Ladders, contestants were not required to reach the final space by exact count.

Contestants could stop at any point and take any keys accumulated and whatever prizes they opened (including the grand prize, if that key was collected). If the contestant failed to reach the final square within 15 turns they lost all of their earned keys.

Special spaces
 Bonus: The contestant stopped a spinning dial marked "Bonus", and moved that many steps on the same turn the bonus was landed on.
 Penalty: The contestant stopped a spinning dial marked "Penalty", and moved back that many spaces.
 Safety: The contestant simply took his/her next turn, with a subsequent miss taking them back to the last Safety space reached.
 Keys: The final space, which awarded a key of the contestant's choosing if reached.

Home-viewer game
Between the first and second games of the day, home viewers had the chance to play for a "prize wonderland" and a mink stole. Viewers sent in postcards with their name, address and the key they would like to use, from 1 to 7. If any of these three elements were missing the card was rendered void and another was picked.

Once a properly-filled-out postcard was selected, host Narz moved over to a board showing, much like the main game, seven keys and their respective locks. Narz would show the card to the camera, then select the key specified by the home viewer and try to unlock the grand prize. If unlocked, the grand prize would be awarded to the home viewer; otherwise, Narz would continue trying to open locks until the one associated with the key was found, with that prize being awarded to the home viewer. Narz would then show the audience which key was the correct one and unlock the grand prize as proof.

Broadcast History

KTLA (1960–1961)
Seven Keys originally aired locally in Los Angeles on KTLA Channel 5 (now an affiliate of The CW) from September 12, 1960 to April 28, 1961. The show proved to be very popular, and caught the attention of ABC.

ABC (1961–1964)
On April 3, 1961 the series began airing on ABC at 2:30 PM Eastern (1:30 Central), replacing the short-lived Road to Reality. Despite facing Art Linkletter's mega-popular House Party on CBS and local programming on NBC (which had not programmed at 2:30 since August 1959, following the disastrous Court of Human Relations), the two shows divided the audience over the next eighteen months.

On October 1, 1962 Keys was struck a large blow when NBC began a new 55-minute series at 2:00 PM (followed by a five-minute newscast) – The Merv Griffin Show. CBS and Linkletter would have the last laugh – Griffin ended on March 29, 1963 and Keys was shifted away to a morning slot on April 1. ABC ceased programming at 2:30/1:30 for five months.

Keys went to 11:30 AM (10:30 Central/Pacific), replacing the Bert Parks game Yours for a Song. Now facing the five-year-old Concentration on NBC and daytime repeats of The Millionaire on CBS, Keys managed to cease the Millionaire repeats on August 30 and send Concentration packing to 11:00/10:00 on September 6. Narz would host the syndicated version of Concentration from 1973-1978.

While CBS stopped programming at 11:30/10:30 for nearly a year, NBC introduced its new Ed McMahon-hosted game Missing Links in the slot. Within the next three months, the new word-association game from Goodson-Todman wore down Keys in the ratings.

On December 30, 1963 Keys was moved one last time to 12:00 noon (11:00 AM Central). The show was now up against the long-running soap Love of Life on CBS and the popular game Your First Impression on NBC, and was beaten soundly in the ratings until it finally admitted defeat on March 27, 1964.

KTLA (1964–1965)
Having spent a turbulent three years on the national schedule, Keys returned to KTLA on April 6. After another nine months, the series took its last bow on January 15, 1965.

Episode status
Despite running for five seasons, the series is believed to be destroyed. Although the status of the KTLA versions remain unknown, the ABC tapes are believed to have been either destroyed or reused as per network practices at the time.

Only three episodes are known to exist among collectors – Episode #9 of the original KTLA version (September 22, 1960), an ABC episode from July 12, 1962, and a second episode from KTLA. A complete ABC episode from May 24, 1963, was discovered on audio tape in March 2010.

The UCLA Film and Television Archive holds two episodes along with a clip from a KTLA blooper reel (described as "a box is stuck from the game show Seven Keys").

References

American Broadcasting Company original programming
1960s American game shows
1960 American television series debuts
1965 American television series endings